Jean La Brunière de Médicis (3 November 1791 in Bordeaux – 5 April 1837 in Paris), known by the stage name of Ferdinand, was a French ballet dancer.

Life
Premier danseur in the Ballet de l'Opéra de Paris from 1813 onwards, Ferdinand played the leads in all its productions until his death. One of the partners of Lise Noblet, his notable appearances with her included a tour to London in 1824.

In 1826, the author of the Nouvelle biographie théâtrale wrote an acid portrait of Ferdinand:

Main rôles
 1820 : Le Carnaval de Venise (Louis Milon) : Fabricio
 1823 : Le Page inconstant (Jean-Pierre Aumer) : Figaro
 1827 : La Somnambule (Aumer) : Edmond
 1828 : La Muette de Portici (with a ballet by Aumer) : premier danseur
 1828 : Lydie (Aumer) : a faun
 1829 : La Belle au bois dormant (Aumer) : Gérard
 1830 : Manon Lescaut (Aumer) : Des Grieux

1791 births
1837 deaths
19th-century French ballet dancers
French male ballet dancers
Entertainers from Bordeaux
Paris Opera Ballet étoiles